Denham is a village and civil parish in the unitary authority of Buckinghamshire, England, approximately  from central London,  northwest of Uxbridge and just north of junction 1 of the M40 motorway. The name is derived from the Old English for "homestead in a valley". It was listed in the Domesday Book of 1086 as Deneham. Denham contains the Buckinghamshire Golf Club.

Buildings
The Church of England parish church of Saint Mary has a flint and stone Norman tower and Tudor monuments. The tree-lined Village Road includes several old red brick houses with mature Wisteria on them, and has been used as a location in British films and television.

Southlands Manor is a Grade II listed building. Its entry on the English Heritage website states that it was built in the 16th century, with a variety of later changes including the addition of four chimney stacks in the early 17th-century. Analysis of a sample of timbers from the main building and its associated barn have found that they were felled in the winters of 1472/3 and 1473/4, indicating that the relevant parts of the building were erected in 1474 or soon after.

The Old Bakery, built in about C14, it is one of the earliest surviving buildings along the village High Street. It is located along what would have been medieval burgage plots. The plots were for laying out a town. Built for the Abbot of Westminster, probably on instructions by Nicholas de Littlington, for his reeve. One survey suggests a very precise date of building of 1367–68, although no dendrochronology has been undertaken. The building phases and outlay are complex, with much alteration. Prior to the 1950s demolition of the former E wing the building formed three cottages/shops.

Denham Film Studios were near the village and where famous films, including Brief Encounter and In Which We Serve were produced. The buildings were demolished in 1980 and the site re-landscaped as a business park and later as a site for luxury homes.

IHG Hotels & Resorts has its corporate headquarters and European head office in Denham. Bosch has its UK head office in Denham.

Development
 Denham Village, the original settlement
 Denham Garden Village, north of Denham Green Lane – built in the 1950s, renovated in 2006
 Denham Green grew up around the shops beside the railway station. Alexander Korda's Denham Film Studios (now demolished) used the Broadwater (Business) Park land between the junction of the road to Rickmansworth (A412) and Moor Hall Road towards Harefield 
 New Denham is a linear part on the old Oxford Road north-west of Uxbridge, west of the Grand Union Canal
 Higher Denham is a locality on the site of a First World War army training and transit camp, placed to take advantage of the adjacent Denham Golf Club station. After the War, the camp land was sold off piecemeal for housing, following a similar trend all over Metro-land. Martin-Baker Aircraft Ltd, manufacturers of aircraft ejector seats, have a small factory in Higher Denham
 Tatling End is on the Oxford Road, west of the junction with the A412, at the top of the hill leading out of the Misbourne valley
 Tilehouse Lane forms the western boundary of the old Tile House and grounds, which were constructed in 1800 and fell into dereliction in the mid 20th Century.  The site was purchased by British Petroleum (BP) who built the Durdent Court residential training and conference centre there in 1983.  BP subsequently sold the facility and it is now the Denham Grove Hotel.

Transport

The 724 Green Line bus service links Harlow and Heathrow Airportpassing through St Albans, Watford, Rickmansworth, Denham and Uxbridgeand terminating at Heathrow Central bus station.

The 331 bus service between Uxbridge and Ruislip stations (operated by Metroline West for London Buses) calls at the Station Parade shops in Denham Green. The 581 circular bus service provides a link between the various areas of Denham and Uxbridge bus station. The Saturdays-only 582 service links the various Denhams with Iver, Slough and Windsor. The 101, 102, 105 and 580 run through the outskirts of Denham.

Denham Aerodrome   is an operational general aviation aerodrome established in the early 1900s. Sited on higher land to the north of the village, it is the base of many private and executive aircraft and helicopters with several hangars and a hard runway. During the First World War in 1915, RAF Denham was established as a flying training school for Flight Cadets.

Schools
Denham Village School (formerly Denham Village Infant School, and originally had classes for Reception and Years 1 and 2), in Cheapside Lane, is the original school for Denham, and now has classes for Reception and Years 1, 2, 4 and 5. The school building dates from 1832 and is listed.

Denham Green E-ACT Primary Academy is located on Nightingale Way and opened in September 2013. Replacing the former Tilehouse Combined School, it is for children ages 4–11, and offers pre-school services. The school's current leadership team completed an Ofsted inspection shortly before converting to an Academy. Ofsted noted that the school was a Good school with Outstanding features. The academy accepts all children from the Denham area (including Denham Village, Denham Green, Maple Cross, Harefield and North Uxbridge) who wish to attend the school.

Sports
 Denham contains the Buckinghamshire Golf Club and the Denham Golf Club.
 Denham Cricket Club, on Cheapside Lane, currently play in Morrant's Chiltern Cricket League.
 Denham United Football Club, on Tilehouse Lane, play in the High Wycombe Sunday Football Combination Division 1.

Demography

Notable residents
 Raymond Baxter, BBC Television presenter, lived in Denham until 1978.
  Mary Hayley Bell English actress and writer, married to Sir John Mills, lived in Denham from 1975 until her death in 2005.
 Cilla Black, singer, entertainer and television personality had her main residence in Denham Green, bought with her late husband Bobby in the 1970s. In a burglary in 2002 £1 million worth of gems were stolen.
 Sir George Bowyer, 5th Baronet was born at Denham Court.
 Brian Connolly, lead singer with 1970s glam rock band Sweet, lived at Denham until his death in 1997.
 Jess Conrad, actor and singer, lived in Denham.
 Edward Cooke, British politician and pamphleteer was born in Denham.
 Dame Isobel Cripps, overseas aid organiser, was born in Denham.
 Paul Daniels, magician, lived in Denham.
 Sir John Mills, film actor, was a resident of the village for many years, and is commemorated by a blue plaque on Hills House, his former residence by the church.
 Sir Roger Moore, actor, lived in Sherwood House, Tilehouse Road, Denham.
 Mike Oldfield, musician, lived in Tilehouse Lane, Denham 1979–86.
 Harry Saltzman, Canadian-born Hollywood producer who produced the James Bond films in the 1960s lived most of his life in Denham.
  Robert Vansittart, 1st Baron Vansittart, senior British diplomat and Chief Diplomatic Adviser to the British Government in the 1920s and 30s, lived in Denham Place until his death in 1957.
 Dennis Wise, former Wimbledon, Chelsea and England football player and manager, lives in Denham.

Twinning
Twinned with Denham, Shark Bay, Western Australia

References

External links

Denham Aerodrome
 Midsomer Murders locations in Denham

 
Villages in Buckinghamshire
Civil parishes in Buckinghamshire
South Bucks District